Johnny Armour (born 26 October 1968 in Chatham, Kent) is an English amateur flyweight and professional super fly/bantam/super bantam/featherweight boxer of the 1990s and 2000s.

As an amateur he won the 1990 Amateur Boxing Association of England (ABAE) flyweight title, against Paul Ingle (Scarborough ABC), boxing out of St Marys ABC  (Chatham, Kent).

As a professional he won the European Boxing Union (EBU) bantamweight title, World Boxing Union (WBU) bantamweight title, and Commonwealth bantamweight title, and was a challenger for the World Boxing Union (WBU) super bantamweight title against Carlos Navarro.

Johnny Armour was trained by Collin Moorcroft, and managed by Terry Toole.

References

External links

Image - Johnny Armour

1968 births
Bantamweight boxers
English male boxers
Featherweight boxers
Flyweight boxers
Living people
Sportspeople from Chatham, Kent
Super-bantamweight boxers
Super-flyweight boxers